is the eighth studio album by Japanese rock band Sakanaction. It was released on March 30, 2022, through their own label NF Records, which is a Victor Entertainment subsidiary.

Themes 
The album is a concept album, dealing with what an album is in the digital age. The title "Adapt" is a reference to how the band adapted during the COVID-19 pandemic.

Release 
Prior to the album's release, a national tour was held across Japan. The album was released on March 30, 2022. Two singles titled "plateau" and "Shock!" were spawned from the album, the latter of which was used as the theme to the film Lupin's Daughter. The song "Tsuki no Wan" was also used in a commercial for the Toyota Yaris Cross. Another national tour was held after the album's release, in the second half of 2022. Adapt is part of a two album project, with a follow-up album titled "Apply" scheduled to be released in 2023.

Track listing

Charts

References 

2022 albums
Japanese-language albums
Sakanaction albums